Gating is a type of punishment similar to a detention used typically at educational institutions, especially boarding schools. Precisely what a gating consists of and the rules surrounding it will vary between institutions, but the common element is that someone who has been gated is not permitted to leave the establishment. The word is used as both a noun and a verb.

References 

School punishments
Punishments